Pycnosiphorus is a genus of stag beetles found in South America.

Appearance 
Relatively small (11–17 millimetres), oblong, black or brown-black stag beetle. The top is more or less covered with gold or orange shells, which can form an orange border of the pronotum or wing covers. The jaws of the males can be slightly enlarged and curved.

Habitat 
The species live in temperate forests, often at high altitudes.

Distribution
The genus is found only in Chile and neighbouring areas of Argentina.

External links 

 Generic Guide to New World Scarabid Beetles – Pycnosiphorus
 Picture gallery (includes Erichius-families)

Lucanidae
Beetles described in 1851